Old Pine Trees (Norwegian:Gamle furutrær) is a painting by Lars Hertervig from 1865.

Lars Hertervig painted Old Pine Trees at the age of 35 in Stavanger. He then worked in a carpentry and paint shop in the town, after studying the art of painting a few years at the Art Academy in Düsseldorf for Hans Gude. He had also visited England and the Mediterranean countries.

Description 
The painting shows two old pines in a forest early, sunny day. Between the dark earth and the bright sky. In the valleys is a blue-gray morning, and in the background the snow-capped mountains.

Provenance 
Petra Aanensen (1858-?), Single daughter of master painter Peder Aanensen (1821-?), In 1940, his artistic estate left the family for the  Stavanger Kunstforening. This included the painting, which has been in family ownership from 1865. Then the painting came with the rest of the art in 1992, when the permanent collection became part of the Rogaland Art Museum in Stavanger, today called the Stavanger kunstmuseum.

Other paintings with forest motifs of Lars Hertervig

Sources 
 Holger Kofoed: I Lars Hertervigs skog, Gyldendal Tiden 1991, 
 Inger M. Renberg, Holger Koefoed och Kari Greve:  Lars Hertervig – fragmenter, Labyrinth Press 2005,

References

External links 
 Tolkning av Gamle furutrær, audio
 3D-animation av Gamle furutrær av Yngve Zakarias
 https://web.archive.org/web/20160303214941/http://www.museumstavanger.no/museene/stavanger-kunstmuseum/samlingene/lars-hertervig/biografi/gamle-furutraer/

1865 paintings
Norwegian paintings
Paintings in Norway